Debra Christofferson (born January 9, 1963) is an American actress known for her roles in film and television. She is from Spearfish, South Dakota.

Filmography

Film

Television

References

External links
 

Living people
American film actresses
Place of birth missing (living people)
American television actresses
21st-century American women
1963 births